East Timor Trading Group is a group of companies based in Dili, Timor-Leste, founded by Mr Sakib and Mrs Neelo Awan in July 2002

Beginning as a distributor of fast-moving consumer goods for retail outlets around Dili, the company has expanded to distribute products from some of the world's leading brands throughout Timor-Leste. The company operates across Sales and Distribution: the import, sale, and distribution of fast-moving consumer goods, and Retail and Hospitality: chains of Burger King franchise restaurants, Gloria Jean's Coffees restaurants, Cheers Bottle Shops, along with Il Gelato in Timor Plaza, and the boutique hotel Discovery Inn incorporating award-winning Diya Restaurant at 84 Rua 30 de Agosto, Dili. The group employs around 300 people, comprising 50% women and 50% men in its total workforce.

History and founder 

Pakistan-born founder, Sakib Awan moved to Sydney, Australia in 1987 with his wife, Neelo, and their then two young children. Sakib Awan held senior management positions at the Holiday Inn Menzies at Wynyard in Sydney, followed by the Sheraton Hotel, Darwin.

Upon Sakib Awan's departure from the hospitality industry, the Awans remained in Darwin and established the company Transglobal Marketing, a successful export business which won the Northern Territory New Exporter Award in 1993. Following that award, the Awans were offered premises in Darwin's Trade Development Zone. The following year in 1994, they were awarded Northern Territory Exporter of the Year. From 1993 to 2006, Sakib Awan held the position of Honorary Consul for Mexico to the Northern Territory.

Sakib Awan first visited East Timor in 1997 with a delegation of Darwin businesses in his position as Chair of the International Business Council, Darwin. Then in 2000, Transglobal Marketing became part of a consortium to deliver essential supplies to Australian troops stationed in East Timor after Indonesia's military activity leading up to the Timorese independence vote that year.

After moving to Dili in 2002 to expand the business, Sakib Awan registered the business name East Timor Trading and proceeded to build a successful national distribution and retail business. It won tenders to operate the United Nations Commissaries at PX Maliana (2004) and PX Obrigado (2005). Then in 2007, the company expanded into hotels with the opening of the Discovery Inn, which initially became the headquarters of the European Commission delegation who were stationed in Dili to oversee the country's 2007 elections.

In Timor-Leste, Awan held the position of Honorary Consul for Poland from 2009 to 2019. In 2012, Sakib Awan was awarded the Order of Timor-Leste by Nobel Laureate and then President Dr José Ramos-Horta GColIH GCL for Ongoing Commitment to and Services in Timor-Leste.

Sakib Awan retired as CEO in December 2016 to become Chair of the East Timor Trading Group. He was succeeded as CEO by Mr Sam Aluwihare, who is also vice-chairman on the board of the newly formed Hotel Owners Association of Timor-Leste, which was launched in March 2019 as a critical driver to encourage tourism in Timor-Leste.

References

Companies of East Timor